Inmaculada "Inma" Cuevas Aragón (born 1977) is a Spanish actress. She became popular to the wider audience for her performance as Anabel in the television series Locked Up, having previously stood out for her stage career.

Biography 
Inmaculada Cuevas Aragón was born in 1977 in Madrid.

After studying drama, she landed her first notable television role in Mujeres. She earned wide public recognition after 2015 for her performance in the series Locked Up, in which she played Anabel—a villainous inmate—during three seasons.

Filmography 

Film

Television

Awards and nominations

References 

Spanish film actresses
Spanish stage actresses
1977 births
Spanish television actresses
21st-century Spanish actresses
Living people
Actresses from Madrid